Spilarctia rubilinea is a moth in the family Erebidae. It was described by Frederic Moore in 1866. It is found in Nepal, India (Sikkim, Assam), Bhutan, Myanmar, Vietnam and China (Sichuan, Tibet).

References

rubilinea
Moths described in 1866